Christian P. Minkler is an American sound engineer. He was nominated for an Academy Award in the category Best Sound for the film Once Upon a Time in Hollywood.

Selected filmography 
 Once Upon a Time in Hollywood (2019; co-nominated with Michael Minkler and Mark Ulano)

References

External links 

Living people
Place of birth missing (living people)
Year of birth missing (living people)
American audio engineers
20th-century American engineers
21st-century American engineers
Primetime Emmy Award winners